Air China Inner Mongolia Co., Ltd, branded as Air China Inner Mongolia, is a regional airline in Inner Mongolia, China, with its corporate base in Hohhot Baita International Airport. It is a state-owned airline owned by Air China (80%) and Inner-Mongolia State-owned Capital Management Co., Ltd (20%). As of 2019, Air China Inner Mongolia has 19 destinations, mostly in China. It has an all Boeing 737 fleet of 8 that consists of Boeing 737-700 and -800 aircraft. The airline is founded in 2012 by Air China, serving as a regional branch that increases Air China's presence in Inner-Mongolia. The airline's current chairman in Wang Yingnian serving as Chief Pilot of Air China since 2014.

History 
Air China Inner Mongolia was founded on August 23, 2013 as a 1 billion yuan joint venture between Air China (80%) and Inner Mongolia State-owned Capital Management. On 31 December 2013, Air China Inner Mongolia gets its first aircraft, a Boeing 737-700. On 8 January 2014, the airline commenced operation, with its first flight, CA 1102 from Hohhot Baita International Airport, its operation base and hub, to Beijing Capital International Airport. On May 30, 2014, the airline received its first Boeing 737-800 aircraft, for the purpose to expand on routes to Beijing Capital, Chifeng, Changsha Huanghua, Haikou, Wuhan, and Xiamen.

Destinations 
Air China Inner Mongolia has a total of 19 destinations.

Codeshare 
Air China Inner Mongolia has codeshare agreements with Air China.

Fleet

Current fleet
, Air China Inner Mongolia operates an all-Boeing fleet consisting of the following aircraft:

Livery 

The standard livery of the airline is the standard Air China livery, except the words "Air China Inner Mongolia" and "中國國際航空內蒙古有限公司" are painted above the windows.

Special Liveries 

Neimenggu Livery

The Neimenggu Livery is painted on the first aircraft received by the airline, B-5226, a Boeing 737-700. Its upper fuselage doesn't have any difference with the standard livery, but the blue cheatline is replaced with colourful streamlines. The words "天傲內蒙古" (literal meaning: Pride of the sky of Inner Mongolia) is painted on the rear fuselage above the windows.

Service 
Air China Inner Mongolia offers two classes of service: First Class and Economy class on all Boeing 737-800s. There are a typical configuration of 8 First Class Recliner seats and the remaining are standard economy seats.

Loyalty Programme 
The airline shares the loyalty programme with its parent company Air China, PhoenixMiles. Passengers on Air China Inner Mongolia can accumulate miles.

External links 
 Air China
 Hohhot Baita International Airport

References 

Airlines of China
Regional airlines
Airlines established in 2013